Riverdale is an unincorporated community in Sumner County, Kansas, United States.  It is located about 6 miles southwest of Belle Plaine at the intersection of N Sand Plum Rd and 77th Ave N, or west of U.S. Route 81 next to the railroad.

History
A post office was opened in Riverdale in 1887, and remained in operation until it was discontinued in 1973.

A railroad currently passes through the community, north to south, from Wichita to Wellington.  Previously a railroad passed through the community, east to west, from Belle Plaine to Conway Springs.

Education
The community is served by Wellington USD 353 public school district.

References

Further reading

External links
 Sumner County map, KDOT

Unincorporated communities in Sumner County, Kansas
Unincorporated communities in Kansas